Arctium lappa, commonly called greater burdock, edible burdock, lappa, beggar's buttons, thorny burr, or happy major is a Eurasian species of plants in the family Asteraceae, cultivated in gardens for its root used as a vegetable. It has become an invasive weed of high-nitrogen soils in North America, Australia, and other regions.

Description

It has large, alternating, wavy-edged cordiform leaves that have a long petiole and are pubescent on the underside.

The flowers are purple and grouped in globular capitula, united in clusters. They appear in mid-summer, from July to September. The capitula are surrounded by an involucre made out of many bracts, each curving to form a hook, allowing the mature fruits to be carried long distances on the fur of animals. The fruits are achenes; they are long, compressed, with short pappus hairs. These are a potential hazard for humans, horses, and dogs. The minute, sharply-pointed, bristly pappus hairs easily detach from the top of the achenes and are carried by the slightest breeze – attaching to skin, mucous membranes, and eyes where they can cause severe dermal irritation, possible respiratory manifestations, and ophthalmia.

Chemistry 
Burdock roots contain mucilage, sulfurous acetylene compounds, polyacetylenes and bitter guaianolide-type constituents. Seeds contain arctigenin, arctiin, and butyrolactone lignans.

Similar species 

The burdock could be confused with rhubarb, the leaves of which are toxic.

Distribution and habitat
This species is native to the temperate regions of the Old World, from Scandinavia to the Mediterranean, and from the British Isles through Russia, and the Middle East to India, China, Taiwan and Japan.

It is naturalized almost everywhere and is usually found in disturbed areas, especially in soil rich in humus and nitrogen, preferring full sunlight.

Ecology 
The leaves of greater burdock provide food for the caterpillars of some Lepidoptera, such as the thistle ermine (Myelois circumvoluta).

Uses
The species is commonly cultivated in Japan where it gives its name to a particular construction technique, burdock piling.

Culinary 

The roots are edible cooked. Greater burdock root is known as niúbàng in Chinese, which was borrowed into Japanese as gobō and Korean as ueong, and is widely eaten in Japan, Korea and Taiwan. It was used in Europe during the Middle Ages as a vegetable, but now it is rarely used except in Italy and Portugal, where it is known as bardana or "garduna". It is also known under the same names and eaten in Brazil. The root was traditionally used in Britain as a flavouring in the herbal drink dandelion and burdock, which is still commercially produced.

The root is very crisp and has a sweet, mild, and pungent flavor with a little muddy harshness that can be reduced by soaking julienned/shredded roots in water for five to ten minutes. The harshness shows excellent harmonization with pork in miso soup (tonjiru) and takikomi gohan (a Japanese-style pilaf).
A popular Japanese dish is kinpira gobō, julienned or shredded burdock root and carrot, braised with soy sauce, sugar, mirin and/or sake, and sesame oil. Another is burdock makizushi, rolled sushi filled with pickled burdock root; the burdock root is often artificially colored orange to resemble a carrot. Burdock root can also be found as a fried snack food similar in taste and texture to potato chips and is occasionally used as an ingredient in tempura dishes.
Fermentation of the root by Aspergillus oryzae is also used for making miso and rice wine in Japanese cuisine.

The tender leaf stalks can be peeled and eaten raw or cooked. Immature flower stalks may also be harvested in late spring, before flowers appear. The taste resembles that of artichoke, a burdock relative.

In the second half of the 20th century, burdock achieved international recognition for its culinary use due to the increasing popularity of the macrobiotic diet, which advocates its consumption. The root contains a fair amount of dietary fiber (GDF, 6 g per 100 g), calcium, potassium, amino acids, and is low calorie. It contains polyphenols that causes darkened surface and muddy harshness by formation of tannin-iron complexes. Those polyphenols are caffeoylquinic acid derivatives.

Traditional medicine 
Dried burdock roots (Bardanae radix) are used in traditional medicine. The seeds of greater burdock are employed in traditional Chinese medicine under the name niubangzi (some dictionaries list the Chinese as just 牛蒡 niúbàng.)

References

External links
A modern herbal, burdock
Plants for a future: Arctium lappa

lappa
Flora of Asia
Flora of Europe
Flora of Western Asia
Flora of temperate Asia
Medicinal plants of Europe
Medicinal plants of Asia
Root vegetables
Japanese cuisine
Plants used in traditional Chinese medicine
Plants described in 1753
Taxa named by Carl Linnaeus